This is a new event to the ITF Women's Circuit in 2011. 
Sloane Stephens defeated Anastasiya Yakimova in the final 6–3, 6–1.

Seeds

Draw

Finals

Top half

Bottom half

References
Main Draw
Qualifying Singles

Camparini Gioielli Cup - Trofeo Pompea - Singles